1991 Soviet Second League, Zone East was the last season of association football competition of the Soviet Second League in the Zone East. The competition was won by FC Okean Nakhodka.

The group (zone) consisted predominantly out of Soviet Central Asia clubs. With fall of the Soviet Union and discontinuation of Soviet competition, most clubs of the group joined their top national leagues.

Teams

Promoted teams
Nuravshon Bukhoro
Vostok Ust-Kamenogorsk
Kasansayets Kasansai
Sakhalin Yuzhno-Sakhalinsk
Zhetysu Taldy‑Kurgan

Relegated teams
 Kuzbass Kemerevo

Final standings

Representation by Republic

 : 8
 : 6
 : 5
 : 1
 : 1
 : 1

Top goalscorers
The following were the top ten goalscorers.

External links
 Second League at rsssf.com

East Zone
1991 in Kazakhstani football
football
1991 in Russian football leagues
1991 in Kyrgyzstani football
1991 in Tajikistani football
1991 in Turkmenistani football